Jorge Ariel Guinzburg (3 February 1949 – 12 March 2008) was an Argentine journalist, theatrical producer, humorist, and TV and radio host.

Background
Guinzburg was born on 3 February 1949 to a Jewish family in Buenos Aires. He finished the high school in 1966, along with Carlos Abrevaya. In 1967, Guinzburg and Abrevaya entered the law school but they abandoned their college education soon afterwards. Later on, Guinzburg joined the drama school while he worked as a taxi driver. In 1971, he became scriptwriter for Juan Carlos Mareco and some time later for the Fontana Show.

Career
Abrevaya and Guinzburg became members of Satiricón by 1972 and, according to writer Carlos Ulanovsky, both boys were funny, amiable and good natured.

In 1977, Guinzburg and Abrevaya started publishing a comic called Diógenes y el Linyera in Clarín, one of the most popular newspapers in Buenos Aires.

Guinzburg created more than twenty radio shows such as: El ventilador and Vitamina G. He worked for several advertising agencies and won several awards for his labor.
He starred, directed and produced many theater plays. In TV, he wrote and hosted numerous comedy, news and game shows like Peor es nada, El Legado, La Biblia y el Calefón and Mañanas Informales.

Death
Guinzburg died in the Mater Dei clinic on 2008-3-12. He was in the clinic six days before his death because he suffered the fracture of a vertebra. He was affected by a pulmonary disease (a pleural effusion and a pneumonia generated from a lung cancer). He was 59 at the time of his death. Guinzburg was buried at the La Tablada Israelite Cemetery.

Family
His second wife Andrea Stivel is a TV producer and his daughter Malena Guinzburg is a stand-up comedian.

References

1949 births
2008 deaths
People from Buenos Aires
Jewish Argentine comedians
Argentine male comedians
American Ashkenazi Jews
Argentine Ashkenazi Jews
Argentine journalists
Male journalists
Argentine television personalities
Deaths from pneumonia in Argentina
20th-century comedians
Argentine taxi drivers
Deaths from cancer in Argentina
20th-century journalists